Wijers is a Dutch surname. Notable people with the surname include:

Clemens Wijers (born 1983), Dutch keyboardist, pianist, and composer
Hans Wijers (born 1951), Dutch politician and businessman
Louwrien Wijers (born 1941), Dutch artist and writer 

Dutch-language surnames